Robert Lanctôt (born November 19, 1963) is a Canadian former politician and lawyer.

A lawyer by profession, Lanctôt was elected as a Member of Parliament for the Bloc Québécois in the 2000 federal election representing the riding of Châteauguay. He served in the BQ Shadow Cabinet as Critic for Amateur Sport and 
Children and Youth from 2000 to 2002, Critic for  Scrutiny of Regulations from 2001 to 2002 and Critic for Public Works and Government Services from 2002 to 2003.

On December 11, 2003, following Paul Martin's election as leader of the governing Liberal Party of Canada and the day before Martin's swearing in as Prime Minister, Lanctôt crossed the floor to join the Liberals. His defection occurred days after his riding association passed a resolution stating it no longer wished to work with the MP and did not want him to run for the BQ in the next election.

Lanctôt ran as a Liberal in Châteauguay—Saint-Constant in the 2004 federal election but was defeated by the BQ's Denise Poirier-Rivard.

References

External links

1963 births
Living people
Members of the House of Commons of Canada from Quebec
Bloc Québécois MPs
Liberal Party of Canada MPs
Quebec lieutenants
Lawyers in Quebec
20th-century Canadian lawyers
21st-century Canadian lawyers
21st-century Canadian politicians